Norway sent a squad of 29 athletes to the 2006 European Athletics Championships. The squad included one former medallist at an international championship, Andreas Thorkildsen, but it was long-distance runner Susanne Wigene who took Norway's first medal when she ran in to take the silver medal on the 10,000 metres, a second behind the winner, and the third best time by any Norwegian female runner.

Results

Nations at the 2006 European Athletics Championships
2006 European Athletics Championships
European Athletics Championships